The 2020 Real Monarchs season is the sixth season for Real Monarchs in the United Soccer League Championship, the second-tier professional soccer league in the United States and Canada.

Roster

Current roster

Competitive

USL Championship

Standings — Group C

Match results

U.S. Open Cup 

Due to their ownership by a higher division professional club (Real Salt Lake), Real Monarchs is one of 15 teams expressly forbidden from entering the Cup competition.

References

2020
Real Monarchs
Real Monarchs
Real Monarchs